The Embassy of the Democratic People's Republic of Korea in Islamabad is the diplomatic mission of North Korea to Pakistan. As of 2018, Kim Thae-sop is the Ambassador to Pakistan. North Korea also maintains a Consulate-General in Karachi, Pakistan.

History 
In October, 2017 about $150,000 worth of alcohol was stolen from the private residence of First Secretary Hyon Ki-yong, which led to speculation that North Korea was using diplomatic access to bootleg alcohol, to send money back to North Korea.

See also 

 Consulate-General of North Korea, Karachi
 Foreign relations of North Korea
 List of diplomatic missions of North Korea
 North Korea–Pakistan relations

References 

North Korea
Islamabad
North Korea–Pakistan relations
Buildings and structures in Islamabad